The Bon Secours Hospital, Galway is a private hospital in County Galway, Ireland. The hospital is part of Bon Secours Mercy Health. This includes sister hospitals in Cork, Dublin, Limerick and Tralee. The hospital sees over 18,000 patients per annum, comprising 6,000 in-patients and 12,000 day-cases.

History
Bon Secours Hospital Galway was built in 1954 and was known then as Calvary Hospital. It was
owned and managed by the Sisters of the Little Company of Mary until 1985. Following a short
closure, the hospital reopened as Galvia Private Hospital in 1986. In 1998, Galvia Private Hospital
was purchased by the Bon Secours Health System.

Services
The hospital had major expansions in 2006 and 2009–2011, and has 120 beds, including 22 day case beds, and provides 4 operating theatres. Services provided include cardiology, clinical neurophysiology, histopathology, physiotherapy, respiratory medicine, endoscopy, pharmacy, occupational therapy, and radiology.

Accreditation
The hospital received Joint Commission International accreditation in 2005.

Notable patients
President of Ireland Michael D. Higgins had patellar surgery at the hospital on 13 December 2011.

See also
 Bon Secours Hospital, Cork
 Bon Secours Hospital, Dublin
 Bon Secours Hospital, Tralee

References

External links
 

Bon Secours Sisters
Hospital buildings completed in 1954
1954 establishments in Ireland
Hospitals in County Galway
Hospitals established in 1954
Private hospitals in the Republic of Ireland